Strmina is a nature reserve in the Slovak municipalities of Stupava and Borinka in the Malacky District. It has a protection level of 5 under the Slovak nature protection system. The nature reserve is part of the Little Carpathians Protected Landscape Area.

Description
The protected area was created to protect the karst forms in this locality and to preserve the flora and fauna communities specific to the Little Carpathians.

References

Geography of Bratislava Region
Protected areas of Slovakia
Protected areas established in 1988